Bridport was a parliamentary borough in Dorset, England, which elected two Members of Parliament (MP) to the House of Commons from 1295 until 1868, and then one member from 1868 until 1885, when the borough was abolished.

History
Bridport was continuously represented in Parliament from the first. The medieval borough consisted of the parish of Bridport, a small port and market town, where the main economic interests were sailcloth and rope-making, as well as some fishing. (For some time in the 16th century, the town had a monopoly of making all cordage for the navy.) By 1831, the population of the borough was 4,242, and the town contained 678 houses.

The right to vote was at one period reserved to the town corporation (consisting of two bailiffs and 13 "capital burgesses"), but from 1628 it was exercised by all inhabitant householders paying scot and lot. This was a relatively liberal franchise for the period but nevertheless meant that only a fraction of the townsmen could vote: in 1806, the general election at which Bridport had the highest turnout in the last few years before the Reform Act, a total of 260 residents voted.

Bridport never reached the status of a pocket borough with an openly recognised "patron": the voters retained their freedom of choice and generally expected to extort a price for their votes, so much so that Oldfield recorded of one election in the early 19th century that "several candidates left them at the last election, in consequence of their demanding payment beforehand". Nevertheless, at various periods the borough came under the influence of local grandees and would usually return at least one of their nominees as MPs: the Russells (Dukes of Bedford) in the Elizabethan period and the Sturts in the latter half of the 18th century could normally rely on choosing one member. In 1572 the then Earl of Bedford made use of this influence to have his oldest son elected in defiance of the convention that the heirs of peers could not be members of the House of Commons; the only previous instance had been that of the Earl himself, who had remained an MP when he became heir to the Earldom in 1555. By vote of the House, the young Lord Russell was allowed to keep his seat for Bridport, and the precedent allowed other peers' heirs to sit from that point onwards.

Bridport retained both its seats under the Reform Act, the boundaries being extended to give it the requisite population - parts of the neighbouring parishes of Bradpole, Allington and Waldich, as well as Bridport Harbour, were brought in, increasing the population to about 6,000; in the election of 1832, the first after Reform, the registered electorate was 425. However, the constituency was too small to survive for long. One of its members was removed after the election of 1868 by the Second Reform Act; and the borough was abolished altogether in 1885, the town being incorporated into the Western Dorset county division.

Members of Parliament

MPs 1295–1640 
 Constituency created (1295)

MPs 1640–1868

MPs 1868–1885

Elections

Elections in the 1830s

Elections in the 1840s

 

Warburton resigned by accepting the office of Steward of the Chiltern Hundreds, causing a by-election.

Baillie-Cochrane resigned by accepting the office of Steward of the Chiltern Hundreds in order to seek re-election as a supporter of free trade.

 

After scrutiny, Baillie-Cochrane's election was declared void and Romilly was declared elected on 28 April 1846.

 

Martin withdrew his name early into polling.

Elections in the 1850s

Elections in the 1860s

The seat was reduced to one member.

Elections in the 1870s

Mitchell's death caused a by-election.

Elections in the 1880s

References

Sources

Concise Dictionary of National Biography (1930)

 
 

Parliamentary constituencies in Dorset (historic)
Constituencies of the Parliament of the United Kingdom established in 1295
Constituencies of the Parliament of the United Kingdom disestablished in 1885
Bridport